

This is a list of the National Register of Historic Places listings in Clallam County, Washington.

This is intended to be a complete list of the properties and districts on the National Register of Historic Places in Clallam County, Washington, United States. Latitude and longitude coordinates are provided for many National Register properties and districts; these locations may be seen together in a map.

There are 48 properties and districts listed on the National Register in the county.

Current listings

|}

See also

National Register of Historic Places listings in Washington state
List of National Historic Landmarks in Washington

References

Clallam
History of Clallam County, Washington